The 1982 Kerry Senior Football Championship was the 82nd staging of the Kerry Senior Football Championship since its establishment by the Kerry County Board in 1889.

South Kerry entered the championship as the defending champions.

The final was played on 17 October 1982 at Austin Stack Park in Tralee, between South Kerry and Feale Rangers, in what was their first ever meeting in the final. South Kerry won the match by 0-07 to 0-05 to claim their fifth championship title overall and a second consecutive title.

Results

Final

References

Kerry Senior Football Championship
1982 in Gaelic football